Alain Brunet is a French scholar and specialist on the writer Colette. He served as vice-president of the Société des Amis de Colette. He co-edited the collected works of Colette and co-authored her biography with Claude Pichois. The book won the Prix Goncourt.

References

20th-century French male writers
Living people
Year of birth missing (living people)
Place of birth missing (living people)
Prix Goncourt winners